The 1980 Miami Redskins football team was an American football team that represented Miami University in the Mid-American Conference (MAC) during the 1980 NCAA Division I-A football season. In its third season under head coach Tom Reed, the team compiled a 5–6 record (4–3 against MAC opponents), finished in a tie for third place in the MAC, and outscored all opponents by a combined total of 241 to 192.

The team's statistical leaders included Mark Kelly with 517 passing yards, Greg Jones with 952 rushing yards, and Don Treadwell with 661 receiving yards.

Schedule

References

Miami
Miami RedHawks football seasons
Miami Redskins football